Scutellaria siphocampyloides is a species of flowering plant in the mint family known by the common name grayleaf skullcap. It is endemic to California, where it is widespread throughout the mountain and coastal regions; it is absent from the deserts and the Central Valley. It can be found in forest and woodland habitat, and a variety of open habitat types. It is a perennial herb producing an erect stem or cluster of stems up to about half a meter tall from a system of thin rhizomes. The stems are coated in short, flattened hairs which sometimes have resin glands. The oval leaves are oppositely arranged. The lowest leaves are borne on short petioles. Flowers emerge from the leaf axils. Each flower is held in a calyx of sepals with a large ridge or appendage on the upper part. The tubular corolla can be up to 3.5 centimeters long and has a large upper and lower lip. The upper lip is folded into a beaklike protrusion and the lower has three wide lobes. The corolla is pale lavender to deep purple in color, sometimes with white mottling on the lower lip.

References

External links
Calflora Database: Scutellaria siphocampyloides (Curve flowered skullcap,  Gray leaved skullcap)
Jepson Manual eFlora (TJM2) treatment of Scutellaria siphocampyloides
UC CalPhotos gallery of Scutellaria siphocampyloides (gray leaved skullcap)

siphocampyloides
Endemic flora of California
Flora of the Klamath Mountains
Flora of the Sierra Nevada (United States)
Natural history of the California chaparral and woodlands
Natural history of the California Coast Ranges
Natural history of the Peninsular Ranges
Natural history of the Transverse Ranges
Flora without expected TNC conservation status